Saud Al Thani is a Qatari royalty name, may refer to:

Saud bin Abdelaziz bin Hamad Al Thani (born 1944), prince of Qatar
Saud bin Muhammed Al Thani (1966–2014), prince of Qatar
Saud bin Ahmed Al Thani, footballer and prince of Qatar; see House of Thani